Colo is a city in Story County, Iowa, United States. The population was 845 at the 2020 census. It is part of the Ames, Iowa Metropolitan Statistical Area, which is a part of the larger Ames-Boone, Iowa Combined Statistical Area.

History
Colo was incorporated on April 26, 1876. Railroad official John Blair named the community after his dog.

Geography

Demographics

2010 census
As of the census of 2010, there were 876 people, 348 households, and 252 families living in the city. The racial makeup of the city was 98.6% White, 0.3% African American, 0.2% Native American, 0.3% from other races, and 0.5% from two or more races. Hispanic or Latino of any race were 0.9% of the population.

There were 348 households, of which 33.3% had children under the age of 18 living with them, 56.6% were married couples living together, 10.9% had a female householder with no husband present, 4.9% had a male householder with no wife present, and 27.6% were non-families. 23.6% of all households were made up of individuals, and 10% had someone living alone who was 65 years of age or older. The average household size was 2.52 and the average family size was 2.94.

The median age in the city was 40.9 years. 26.3% of residents were under the age of 18; 6.4% were between the ages of 18 and 24; 23.3% were from 25 to 44; 29.2% were from 45 to 64; and 14.8% were 65 years of age or older. The gender makeup of the city was 49.8% male and 50.2% female.

2000 census
As of the census of 2000, there were 868 people, 339 households, and 248 families living in the city. The racial makeup of the city was 97.70% White, 0.92% African American, 0.46% Asian, 0.23% from other races, and 0.69% from two or more races. Hispanic or Latino of any race were 0.23% of the population.

There were 339 households, out of which 33.6% had children under the age of 18 living with them, 64.3% were married couples living together, 5.9% had a female householder with no husband present, and 26.8% were non-families. 22.1% of all households were made up of individuals, and 11.5% had someone living alone who was 65 years of age or older. The average household size was 2.56 and the average family size was 3.02.

27.6% are under the age of 18, 7.8% from 18 to 24, 30.5% from 25 to 44, 17.5% from 45 to 64, and 16.5% who were 65 years of age or older. The median age was 36 years. For every 100 females, there were 98.2 males. For every 100 females age 18 and over, there were 96.9 males.

The median income for a household in the city was $41,711, and the median income for a family was $48,438. Males had a median income of $33,500 versus $24,091 for females. The per capita income for the city was $19,173. About 2.8% of families and 5.6% of the population were below the poverty line, including 3.1% of those under age 18 and 8.2% of those age 65 or over.

Parks and recreation
Located near Colo is Hickory Grove Park, Story County's largest recreational, fishing, and swimming area with 445 acres, including a  lake.

East of Colo, along the Lincoln Highway, lies Colo Marsh, which drains into the Iowa River just east of Marshalltown.

Education
The community is within the Colo–NESCO Community School District. The district was established on July 1, 1991, by the merger of the Colo and NESCO school districts. The district operates an elementary school in Zearing and a middle and high school in Colo.

Infrastructure

Transportation

Colo is located at the intersection of the historic Lincoln and Jefferson highways. The intersection is marked by the historic complex of Reed/Niland Corner, which includes a museum/diner, vintage gas station, and small park.

For modern-day travelers, Colo lies at the intersection of U.S. Route 30 (halfway between Ames and Marshalltown), and U.S. Route 65 (halfway between Des Moines and Iowa Falls).

Colo lies also along the cross country line of the Union Pacific railroad.

Notable People

• Michael Fitzgerald, longest serving state Treasurer in United States history (1983-2023)

References

External links

Cities in Iowa
Cities in Story County, Iowa
1876 establishments in Iowa
Populated places established in 1876